Eslamabad, Zahedan is a village in Dumak Rural District, in the Central District of Zahedan County, Sistan and Baluchestan Province, Iran. At the 2006 census, its population was 142, in 25 families.

References 

Populated places in Zahedan County